The 1995 UK & Ireland Greyhound Racing Year was the 69th year of greyhound racing in the United Kingdom and Ireland.

Roll of honour

Summary
The National Greyhound Racing Club (NGRC) released the annual returns, with totalisator turnover at £77,837,828 and attendances recorded at 3,652,671 from 6391 meetings. 

Staplers Jo trained by Nick Savva was voted Greyhound of the Year after winning the Anglo Irish International, Produce Stakes, Guineas and Ladbrokes Puppy Derby. Dew Reward trained by Michael O'Donovan was voted Irish Greyhound of the Year after winning the Irish Champion Stakes.

John Coleman won the Greyhound Trainer of the Year.

While William Hill remained part of the doomed Brent Walker, the new owners of Hackney Wick Stadium Fleetfoot Racing (led by its Managing Director Ex-Lloyds broker and racing journalist Robert Parker) had announced an exciting redevelopment plan. However, before the end of the year the plans had turned into a fiasco. Work began on an ambitious project including a £12 million restaurant and state of the art facilities, leading trainers were recruited and the stadium was rebranded 'The London Stadium'. Robert Parker was later replaced by Stephen Rea, with the venture still requiring significant funds and beset with construction problems and internal disagreements the original £14 million scheme to develop the neglected stadium had run into serious problems. Extra cash was raised by rights issues with companies including Rothschild, Henderson Venture Managers and Samuel Montagu. In October 1995 the new stadium was finally ready offering first-class facilities and significantly high prize money. However on the reopening night and despite a capacity crowd the stadium went into receivership during the same evening. Investigations began amidst rumours of fraud, banker Stephen Welton, was pursued by LWT reporter Trevor Phillips and questioned for the Board's failure to conduct due diligence on a prospective buyer who turned out to be an undischarged bankrupt. Parker appeared on Roger Cook's ITV's television program The Cook Report and allegations were made against Stephen Rea.

Tracks
Construction company Hawkins of Harrow went into administration following a lull in the building industry and repayments required to the banks for loans to purchase garden centres. They owned Northern Sports which meant that Oxford Stadium and Ramsgate Stadium were in the hands of the receivers. Ramsgate boss Sheila Yanez believes the track could be sold for £1.2 million but that it would take at least a year to resolve planning issues with the neighbouring garden centre. Oxford General Manager John Blake and Northern Sports Group Racing Manager Mick Wheble were made redundant.

Harlow Stadium opened on 15 March. Toni Nicholls bought the land from receivers when the new football stadium was being built in 1993 and constructed the new facilities including executive suites, a restaurant and conference and banqueting facilities.

Sittingbourne opened on 3 October with new facilities including a track side restaurant, fast food outlets, three licensed bars and three private executive suites.

Eddie Ramsay's SGRC (Scottish Greyhound Racing Company) was in financial difficulties and he sold Powderhall Stadium to a Channel Islands company called Charlotte Twenty-One (that included a shareholder called Walton Hankinson, a housing development specialist).

News
Treacys Triumph broke one of the oldest track records in Ireland after recording 31.68 at Harolds Cross for 580 yards. The half brother of Moral Standards improved Rail Ship's previous record set in 1973.

Competitions
Spring Rose trained by Charlie Lister finished second behind Elliots Gem in the inaugural Puppy Classic at Nottingham. Spring Rose, a white and fawn bitch would make a champion stayer. It was however Ballarue Minx trained by Bill Masters that was the stand out stayer of the year; the white and brindle bitch won the first Cesarewitch to be held at Catford Stadium, which added to her St Leger crown from the previous year.

Principal UK races

+Track Record

Totalisator returns

The totalisator returns declared to the National Greyhound Racing Club for the year 1995 are listed below.

References 

Greyhound racing in the United Kingdom
Greyhound racing in the Republic of Ireland
UK and Ireland Greyhound Racing Year
UK and Ireland Greyhound Racing Year
UK and Ireland Greyhound Racing Year
UK and Ireland Greyhound Racing Year